

Crown
Head of State - Queen Elizabeth II

Federal government
Governor General - Adrienne Clarkson

Cabinet
Prime Minister -  Jean Chrétien
Deputy Prime Minister - Herb Gray then John Manley
Minister of Finance - Paul Martin then John Manley
Minister of Foreign Affairs - John Manley then Bill Graham
Minister of National Defence - Art Eggleton then John McCallum
Minister of Health - Allan Rock then Anne McLellan
Minister of Industry - Brian Tobin then Allan Rock
Minister of Heritage - Sheila Copps
Minister of Intergovernmental Affairs - Stéphane Dion
Minister of the Environment - David Anderson
Minister of Justice - Anne McLellan then Martin Cauchon
Minister of Transport - David Collenette
Minister of Citizenship and Immigration - Elinor Caplan then Denis Coderre
Minister of Fisheries and Oceans - Herb Dhaliwal then Robert Thibault
Minister of Agriculture and Agri-Food - Lyle Vanclief
Minister of Public Works and Government Services - Alfonso Gagliano then Don Boudria then Ralph Goodale
Minister of Human Resources Development - Jane Stewart
Minister of Natural Resources - Ralph Goodale then Herb Dhaliwal

Members of Parliament
See: 37th Canadian parliament

Party leaders
Liberal Party of Canada -  Jean Chrétien
Canadian Alliance - Stockwell Day then Stephen Harper
Bloc Québécois - Gilles Duceppe
New Democratic Party- Alexa McDonough
Progressive Conservative Party of Canada - Joe Clark

Supreme Court justices
Chief Justice: Beverley McLachlin
Frank Iacobucci
John C. Major
Michel Bastarache
William Ian Corneil Binnie
Louise Arbour
Louis LeBel
Claire L'Heureux-Dubé then Marie Deschamps
Charles D. Gonthier

Other
Speaker of the House of Commons - Peter Milliken
Governor of the Bank of Canada - David Dodge
Chief of the Defence Staff - General R.R. Henault

Provinces

Premiers
Premier of Alberta - Ralph Klein
Premier of British Columbia - Gordon Campbell
Premier of Manitoba - Gary Doer
Premier of New Brunswick - Bernard Lord
Premier of Newfoundland - Roger Grimes
Premier of Nova Scotia - John Hamm
Premier of Ontario - Mike Harris then Ernie Eves
Premier of Prince Edward Island - Pat Binns
Premier of Quebec - Bernard Landry
Premier of Saskatchewan - Lorne Calvert
Premier of the Northwest Territories - Stephen Kakfwi
Premier of Nunavut - Paul Okalik
Premier of Yukon - Pat Duncan then Dennis Fentie

Lieutenant-governors
Lieutenant-Governor of Alberta - Lois Hole
Lieutenant-Governor of British Columbia - Iona Campagnolo
Lieutenant-Governor of Manitoba - Peter Liba
Lieutenant-Governor of New Brunswick - Marilyn Trenholme Counsell
Lieutenant-Governor of Newfoundland and Labrador - Arthur Maxwell House then Edward Roberts
Lieutenant-Governor of Nova Scotia - Myra Freeman
Lieutenant-Governor of Ontario - Hilary Weston then James Bartleman
Lieutenant-Governor of Prince Edward Island - Léonce Bernard
Lieutenant-Governor of Quebec - Lise Thibault
Lieutenant-Governor of Saskatchewan - Lynda Haverstock

Mayors
Toronto - Mel Lastman
Montreal - Gérald Tremblay
Vancouver - Philip Owen then Larry Campbell
Ottawa - Bob Chiarelli
Victoria - Alan Lowe

Religious leaders
Roman Catholic Bishop of Quebec -  Archbishop Maurice Couture then Cardinal Archbishop Marc Ouellet
Roman Catholic Bishop of Montreal -  Cardinal Archbishop Jean-Claude Turcotte
Roman Catholic Bishops of London - Bishop John Michael Sherlock then  Bishop Ronald Peter Fabbro
Moderator of the United Church of Canada - Marion Pardy

See also
2001 Canadian incumbents
Events in Canada in 2002
 2003 Canadian incumbents
 Governmental leaders in 2002
Canadian incumbents by year

2002
Incumbents
Canadian incumbents
Canadian leaders